Siyak may refer to:

 Siyaka, a 10th-century Paramara king of central India
 Sihag, a clan of India
 Tonb-e Siyak, a village in Iran